Salvador Borrego Escalante (24 April 1915 – 8 January 2018) was a Mexican journalist and historical revisionist writer.

Borrego began his career in journalism in 1936, as a reporter of the Mexican newspaper Excélsior where he eventually was appointed editor-in-chief. He became a Nazi sympathizer in 1937, when Borrego perceived an anti-German bias in the Mexican mass media, allegedly fostered by a lobby of pro-Western advertisers.

He has written several books, including Derrota Mundial ("Worldwide Defeat"), published on 1953, in which he claims that the defeat of Adolf Hitler and Nazi Germany was a defeat for the entire world because the Nazis were fighting against what they believed to be an international Jewish evil, and their plan to take over the global economy. In América Peligra ("The Americas in Danger"), published in 1964, he focuses the story on what he asserts is an international Jewish conspiracy to provide what he claims to be the true account of the unfolding of historical events in Mexico and Latin America.

In 1996 Catalan police closed a bookstore managed by Spanish Neo-Nazi Pedro Varela, and confiscated a host of Nazi books and publications, including those of Salvador Borrego. Varela was arrested, but the bookstore opened again several months later. Borrego turned 100 on 24 April 2015.

On 8 January 2018, Borrego died at the age of 102.

References

External links
 Official site (Spanish) | Sitio Oficial

1915 births
2018 deaths
Anti-Masonry
Antisemitism in Mexico
Mexican anti-communists
Mexican journalists
Male journalists
Mexican conspiracy theorists
Mexican propagandists
Mexican centenarians
Far-right politics in Mexico
Fascism in Mexico
Antisemitic propaganda
Holocaust deniers
Men centenarians
Neo-Nazism in North America
People from Mexico City